Cleveland University may refer to:

 Cleveland University, a defunct university in Cleveland, Ohio (1851-1853)
 Cleveland State University, in Cleveland, Ohio
 Cleveland University-Kansas City, in Overland Park, Kansas
 Cleveland Institute of Music, in Cleveland, Ohio
 Cleveland Institute of Art, in Cleveland, Ohio
 Universities in Cleveland, Ohio

See also
 Case Western Reserve University, in Cleveland, Ohio
 Cleveland College (disambiguation)
 Cleveland School (disambiguation)